"Talk to Me, Dance with Me" is a song by Canadian indie rock band Hot Hot Heat from their first album, Make Up the Breakdown. The song was released in the U.S. as the third single from the album on November 3, 2003. It reached number 33 on the Alternative Songs chart.

Track listings

CD1
 Talk to Me, Dance with Me
 Oh Goddamnit
 Le Le Low (Live)

2003 singles
Hot Hot Heat songs
Sub Pop singles
2002 songs
Songs written by Dante DeCaro
Songs written by Steve Bays